Melvyn Morris CBE is an English businessman and failed football club chairman.

As a web entrepreneur, Morris gained a large part of his fortune through his successful startup investment in King, the firm behind the mobile game Candy Crush Saga. More recently, he became known for his disastrous tenure as owner of Derby County F.C., which saw debts accrued, acrimony with the EFL, a points deduction, a transfer embargo and the loss of players (including academy products), culminating in the club entering administration in 2021 and being relegated to the third tier of English football for the first time in over thirty years.

Business ventures 

Morris was born and raised in the Littleover area of Derby. Out of school, he first worked as a tile and flooring manager at a company he helped to establish in Spain, before venturing into entrepreneurship.  After leaving the flooring firm, he returned to the UK to develop a dating website called uDate, which he went on to sell for £100 million. He used the money secured from the sale to invest in Prevx, an internet security firm, which was later sold to Webroot. He then helped to set up King, which he chaired from 2003 onwards until stepping down in 2014. When King was sold to Activision Blizzard, Morris collected £450 million.

According to the Sunday Times Rich List 2020, Morris is said to have amassed a fortune of £515 million, making him the joint 268th richest person in the UK, and the joint 11th richest in the East Midlands.

Morris was appointed Commander of the Order of the British Empire (CBE) in the 2017 Birthday Honours for services to business and charitable services.

Derby County 
Morris bought a 22% stake in Derby County F.C. in May 2014, shortly after the club's 2014 Football League Championship play-off Final defeat to Queens Park Rangers. He was involved in a league-wide push to increase TV revenue for non-Premier League clubs.

The following season he assumed ownership of the club, overseeing unprecedented levels of spending including breaking the club's transfer record four times in his first three years. He also oversaw an equally unprecedented managerial turnover: nine managers between June 2015 and May 2021. In this period the club endured three unsuccessful play-off campaigns, failing in the semi-finals twice and losing in the 2019 final to Aston Villa; in May 2021, the club narrowly avoided relegation.

Earlier, in October 2020, it was announced that Morris was intending to sell the club and was actively seeking new owners. After two unsuccessful attempts by Morris to sell the club, the board of directors announced in September 2021 that the club was to go into administration, resulting in a total deduction of twenty-one points and leading to the club's relegation from the EFL Championship and put the club at risk of being wound up.

References

Living people
English businesspeople
Derby County F.C. directors
People from Littleover
Commanders of the Order of the British Empire
Year of birth missing (living people)